Aurel Eugen Munteanu (born 28 January 1955) is a Romanian former football midfielder. After he ended his football career, he became a businessman. His fortune is estimated by the Romanian press at figures between €85 million and €87 million.

Honours
Sportul Studențesc București
Balkans Cup: 1979–80

References

1955 births
Living people
Romanian footballers
Association football midfielders
Liga I players
Liga II players
FC Sportul Studențesc București players
FC Petrolul Ploiești players
Romanian businesspeople
Sportspeople from Sibiu